Daniel Garcia (born October 14, 1993) is an American soccer player.

Career

Youth and College
Garcia began his career with the FC Dallas Academy. In 2012, he led Dallas to their first U17/U18 Development Academy title.

On February 8, 2012, it was announced that Garcia was one of nine players who signed a letter of intent to play college soccer at the University of North Carolina.  In his freshman year, Garcia made 23 appearances and tallied four goals and six assists on his way to being named ACC Freshman of the Year.  It would turn out to be his only season with the Tar Heels.

Professional
On June 18, 2013, Garcia signed a homegrown contract with MLS club FC Dallas, making him the 11th homegrown signing in club history.  However, he wasn't eligible for player for Dallas in MLS competition until the 2014 season. He made his professional debut on May 4, 2014 in a 1-0 defeat to New York Red Bulls.

Garcia was loaned by FC Dallas to their United Soccer League (USL) affiliate Arizona United SC on April 27, 2015.

After his release from Dallas at the end of the season, Garcia signed with United Soccer League side San Antonio FC on February 11, 2016.

International
Garcia represented the United States in the under-18 and under-20 level, including the 2013 CONCACAF U-20 Championship and the 2013 FIFA U-20 World Cup.

References

External links

North Carolina Tar Heels bio
USSF Development Academy bio
U.S. soccer bio

1993 births
Living people
American soccer players
North Carolina Tar Heels men's soccer players
FC Dallas players
Phoenix Rising FC players
San Antonio FC players
Association football midfielders
Soccer players from Texas
Major League Soccer players
USL Championship players
United States men's youth international soccer players
United States men's under-20 international soccer players
Homegrown Players (MLS)